World Café is a 2018 studio album by Canadian flutist and composer Ron Korb. The compositions are mainly inspired by Korb's experience travelling to the countries in the Spanish speaking world such as Spain, Cuba, and the countries of South America.

The album was released through Humbledragon Entertainment and consists of 12 original tracks, composed and produced by Korb, and packaged as a 24-page picture story book with CD.

Track listing
The album consists of 12 tracks, all composed and produced by Ron Korb.

Personnel
 Ron Korb: producer, composer, flute, bass flute, ocarina
 Hilario Durán: piano
 Joseph Macerollo: accordion 
 Johannes Linstead: guitar
 Margaret Maria: cello
 Jorge (Papiosco) Torres: congas
 Roberto Riveron: bass
 Richard Fortin: guitar
 Ben Riley: drums
 Steve Lucas: acoustic bass, bass
 Laila Biali: piano
 Larry Crowe: drums, cahon, palmas, maracas, bongos, triangle, shakers
 Bill Evans: piano 
 Aidan Mason: guitar
 Bill Bridges: guitar
 Paul Intson: acoustic bass, recording engineer
 Gary Honess: recording engineer, mixing engineer, mastering engineer
 Adrian Ellis: recording engineer
 Jade Yeh: photography, album design

Reviews
'The release of World Café by Canadian flutist / composer Ron Korb sets a new level of excellence in 21st century Contemporary Instrumental fusion music.' – Music Web Express

'Though he's explored the music of many cultures, it all started with jazz, which is still a part of his playing today. We caught up with the Canadian musician, who has just released his 20th album, World Café, a jazz inflected mix of Latin and Caribbean flavored original compositions.' – All About Jazz by Rob Caldwell

'Ron's flute playing is smooth and melodic, he effortlessly drifts from a ballad to a passionate Cuban tempo with ease.' – Dave Milbourne editor, Toronto Jazz

"World Café is an equipoise of beautiful melodies, seductive rhythms, and memorable improvisations that is integrated with love and passion. The artistry of Ron Korb is so brilliant and the album is a perfect representation of intercultural communication at its best. I encourage all music listeners to check out this album." – Dr. José Valentino

References

2018 albums
Ron Korb albums
Instrumental albums
World music albums by Canadian artists